Palamutlu is a village in the Pervari District of Siirt Province in Turkey. The village is populated by Kurds of the Botikan tribe and had a population of 1,443 in 2021.

The hamlet of Yazıcık is attached to the village.

References 

Villages in Pervari District
Kurdish settlements in Siirt Province